The Jacumba Mountains are a mountain range of the Peninsular Ranges system, located in eastern San Diego County, Southern California, near the U.S. border with Mexico.

The mountain range lies in a northwest-southeasterly direction, east of the In-Ko-Pah Mountains, and north of Interstate 8.

The Tierra Blanca Mountains and the Sawtooth Mountains are to the northwest, and Anza-Borrego Desert State Park due north. The Coyote Mountains lie to the northeast. The Volcanic Hills area lies on the northeast flank of the range.

References

Peninsular Ranges
Mountain ranges of the Colorado Desert
Mountain ranges of San Diego County, California
Mountain Empire (San Diego County)